Andreas Hermansson (born January 8, 1973) is a Swedish former football player, who played as a forward for Allsvenskan clubs such as Trelleborgs FF, IFK Göteborg, Hammarby IF, Enköpings SK and GIF Sundsvall. Along with two stints at his hometown club Umeå FC.

He's mostly noticed for winning Allsvenskan in 2001 with Hammarby IF and runner-up league top goalscorer the same year.

External links 

1973 births
Living people
Swedish footballers
Association football forwards
Allsvenskan players
Trelleborgs FF players
IFK Göteborg players
Hammarby Fotboll players
Enköpings SK players
GIF Sundsvall players
Umeå FC players
Sportspeople from Umeå